You Are There is a collaborative effort between Roberta Gambarini and Hank Jones. It is Gambarini's fourth album.

Critical reception 

Suzanne Lorge reviews the album for All About Jazz and gives it 5 out of a possible 5 stars. She says, "This CD promises to be one of the better vocal releases of 2008. Beyond Gambarini's impressive vocals, listeners are advised to pay close attention to Jones' intuitive understanding of phrasing and dynamics."

Ken Dryden at AllMusic begins his review, "Roberta Gambarini is a breath of fresh air among female jazz vocalists. Gifted with superb clear diction, a warm engaging voice, and an uncanny ability to bring out the best in each song, Gambarini shines throughout this one-afternoon session, recorded without isolation booths, splicing, or overdubs. Her sole accompanist is the masterful pianist Hank Jones, a veteran who knows something about inspiring great vocalists with his inventive piano playing, having recorded with Ella Fitzgerald, Billie Holiday, Anita O'Day, and Helen Merrill during a career that began over six decades prior to this session."

Christopher Loudon reviews You Are There for JazzTimes and writes, "This sublime pairing of legendary pianist and destined-to-be-iconic vocalist will be remembered as one of standout albums of the year, perhaps of the decade. Like so many works of genius, it is deceptively simple: two superlative craftspeople matching wits while igniting one another’s imaginations."

Track listing

Musicians
Roberta Gambarini – vocals
Hank Jones – piano

Production
Larry Clothier – Producer
Al Schmitt – Mixer

Track information and credits adapted from AllMusic and verified from the album's liner notes.

Charts

References

External links 
EmArcy Records Official site

2007 albums
Hank Jones albums
Roberta Gambarini albums